Pastellière castle, is a late 15th/early 16th century castle situated in Combrand, Deux-Sèvres.

History 
Construction of the castle began in the late 15th century and the early 16th century. In 1641, the castle still belonged to the La Pastellière family.

In October 1704, the castle was purchased by Charles Durant (son of Philippe Durant, Seigneur of the Touche, and Janne Merlet), a weaving merchant from Bressuire, who bought, for 4,000 pounds, the position of mayor of Bressuire for life in 1703.

In 1793, during the War in the Vendée, the castle served as a military hospital for wounded Vandéians. In 1794 the second divisions of the infernal columns under the command of general  tried, but failed, to burn down the castle.

In 1889, the castle transferred to the  family.

In 1953, the castle was fragmented. It was then sold to the Catta family, friends of the Durant de La Pastellière family. If it weren't for the Catta family, the castle would have been torn down.

The castle sold in 2003 to Foncier SA. Since its acquisition, the castle was renovated resuming its historical style.

Inventaire des monuments historiques registration 

References 

Deux-Sèvres
Châteaux in Deux-Sèvres
History of Deux-Sèvres
Buildings and structures in Deux-Sèvres